Lithuania participated in the Eurovision Song Contest 2011 with the song "C'est ma vie" written by Paulius Zdanavičius and Andrius Kairys. The song was performed by Evelina Sašenko. The Lithuanian broadcaster Lithuanian National Radio and Television (LRT) organised the national final "Eurovizijos" dainų konkurso nacionalinė atranka (Eurovision Song Contest national selection) in order to select the Lithuanian entry for the 2011 contest in Düsseldorf, Germany. The national final took place over four weeks and involved 40 competing entries. In the final, thirteen artists and songs remained and the winner was selected over two rounds of voting. In the first round, the combination of votes from a jury panel and a public vote selected the top three to qualify to the superfinal. In the superfinal, a jury vote entirely selected "C'est ma vie" performed by Evelina Sašenko as the winner.

Lithuania was drawn to compete in the first semi-final of the Eurovision Song Contest which took place on 10 May 2011. Performing during the show in position 17, "C'est ma vie" was announced among the top 10 entries of the first semi-final and therefore qualified to compete in the final on 12 May. It was later revealed that Lithuania placed fifth out of the 19 participating countries in the semi-final with 81 points. In the final, Lithuania performed in position 4 and placed nineteenth out of the 25 participating countries, scoring 63 points.

Background 

Prior to the 2011 contest, Lithuania had participated in the Eurovision Song Contest eleven times since its first entry in 1994. The nation’s best placing in the contest was sixth, which it achieved in 2006 with the song "We Are the Winners" performed by LT United. Following the introduction of semi-finals in 2004, Lithuania, to this point, has managed to qualify to the final three times. In the 2010 contest, "Eastern European Funk" performed by InCulto failed to qualify to the final.

For the 2011 contest, the Lithuanian national broadcaster, Lithuanian National Radio and Television (LRT), broadcast the event within Lithuania and organised the selection process for the nation's entry. Other than the internal selection of their debut entry in 1994, Lithuania has selected their entry consistently through a national final procedure. LRT confirmed their intentions to participate at the 2011 Eurovision Song Contest on 24 November 2010 and announced the organization of "Eurovizijos" dainų konkurso nacionalinė atranka, which would be the national final to select Lithuania's entry for Düsseldorf.

Before Eurovision

"Eurovizijos" dainų konkurso nacionalinė atranka 
"Eurovizijos" dainų konkurso nacionalinė atranka (Eurovision Song Contest national selection) was the national final format developed by LRT in order to select Lithuania's entry for the Eurovision Song Contest 2011. The competition involved a four-week-long process that commenced on 5 February 2011 and concluded with a winning song and artist on 24 February 2011. The four shows took place at the LRT studios in Vilnius and were hosted by Giedrius Masalskis. The shows were broadcast on LTV, LTV World and Lietuvos Radijas as well as online via the broadcaster's website lrt.lt. The final was also streamed online at the official Eurovision Song Contest website eurovision.tv.

Format 
The 2011 competition involved 40 entries and consisted of four shows. The first three shows were the semi-finals consisting of twelve or fourteen entries each. The top three entries proceeded to the final from each semi-final, while four wildcard acts were also selected for the final out of the remaining non-qualifying acts from the semi-finals. Three of the wildcards were selected by LRT, while an additional wildcard was selected by the public through an internet voting platform on the website zebra.lt. In the final, the winner was selected from the remaining fourteen entries over two rounds of voting. The first round results selected the top three entries, while the second round determined the winner. A monetary prize of 25,000 LTL was also awarded to the winning artist(s) by the Lithuanian Copyright Protection Association (LATGA) in order to assist in their preparation for the Eurovision Song Contest.

The results of each of the five shows were determined by a jury panel and public televoting. The qualifiers of the semi-finals and the first round of the final were determined by the 50/50 combination of votes from the jury and public. The ranking developed by both streams of voting was converted to points from 1-8, 10 and 12 and assigned based on the number of competing songs in the respective show. The public could vote through telephone and SMS voting. Ties were decided in favour of the entry that received the most points from the jury. In the second round of the final, only the jury voted. The jury panel in the semi-finals consisted of five members, while the jury panel in the final consisted of fourteen members.

Competing entries 
LRT opened a submission period on 24 November 2010 for artists and songwriters to submit their entries with the deadline on 3 January 2011. On 11 January 2011, LRT announced the 43 entries selected for the competition from 70 submissions received. Among the artists were previous Lithuanian Eurovision contestants Linas Adomaitis, who represented Lithuania in 2004, and Sasha Song, who represented the Lithuania in 2009. The final changes to the list of 43 competing acts were later made with withdrawal of the songs "Puffy Lips" performed by 24for7, "Will You" performed by Asta Pilypaitė and "Dreams" performed by Vilija.

Shows

Semi-finals
The three semi-finals of the competition aired on 5, 12 and 19 February 2011 and featured the 40 competing entries. The members of the jury consisted of Darius Užkuraitis (Opus 3 director; all semi-finals), Rosita Čivilytė (singer; first and third semi-final), Gytis Ivanauskas (choreographer and dancer; first semi-final), Faustas Latėnas (member of LATGA; first semi-final), Jonas Vilimas (producer; first semi-final), Eglė Nepaitė (producer; second semi-final), Teisutis Makačinas (Vice President of LATGA; second semi-final), Lukas Pačkauskas (producer; second semi-final), Mindaugas Urbaitis (member of LATGA; third semi-final), Neda Malunavičiūtė (singer; third semi-final), Laura Remeikienė (singer-songwriter; third semi-final) and Vytautas Juozapaitis (opera singer; third semi-final). The top three entries advanced to the final from each semi-final, while the bottom entries were eliminated. On 21 February 2011, the four entries that had received a wildcard to also proceed to the final were announced; "Tomorrow and After" performed by Martynas Beinaris received the zebra.lt wildcard.

Final
The final of the competition took place on 24 February 2011 and featured the remaining thirteen entries that qualified from the semi-finals. The final was the only show in the competition to be broadcast live; all other preceding shows were pre-recorded earlier in the week before their airdates. The members of the jury consisted of Jonas Vilimas (producer), Darius Užkuraitis (Opus 3 director), Tomas Sinickis (musician, singer-songwriter), Rosita Čivilytė (singer), Raigardas Tautkus (musician and producer), Eglė Nepaitė (producer), Nijolė Švagždienė (artistic director of the studio DND), Artūras Novikas (conductor, composer and singer), Ramūnas Zilnys (music reviewer), Linas Rimša (composer), Saulius Urbonavičius (musician, singer-songwriter), Mindaugas Urbaitis (member of LATGA), Teisutis Makačinas (composer) and Vaclovas Augustinas (composer, conductor). The winner was selected over two rounds of voting. In the first round, the three entries that gained the most points from the jury vote and the public vote advanced to the superfinal, while the bottom ten were eliminated. In the superfinal, "C'est ma vie" performed by Evelina Sašenko was selected as the winner after gaining maximum points from all jurors. In addition to the performances of the competing entries, Bartas and Eglė Jurgaitytė performed as the interval act.

At Eurovision 
According to Eurovision rules, all nations with the exceptions of the host country and the "Big Five" (France, Germany, Italy, Spain and the United Kingdom) are required to qualify from one of two semi-finals in order to compete for the final; the top ten countries from each semi-final progress to the final. The European Broadcasting Union (EBU) split up the competing countries into six different pots based on voting patterns from previous contests, with countries with favourable voting histories put into the same pot. On 17 January 2011, a special allocation draw was held which placed each country into one of the two semi-finals, as well as which half of the show they would perform in. Lithuania was placed into the first semi-final, to be held on 10 May 2011, and was scheduled to perform in the second half of the show. The running order for the semi-finals was decided through another draw on 15 March 2011 and Lithuania was set to perform in position 17, following the entry from Portugal and before the entry from Azerbaijan.

The two semi-finals and final were broadcast in Lithuania on LTV and LTV World with commentary by Darius Užkuraitis. The Lithuanian spokesperson, who announced the Lithuanian votes during the final, was Giedrius Masalskis.

Semi-final 
Evelina Sašenko took part in technical rehearsals on 1 and 5 May, followed by dress rehearsals on 9 and 10 May. This included the jury show on 9 May where the professional juries of each country watched and voted on the competing entries.

The Lithuanian performance featured Evelina Sašenko performing on stage in a white dress with black applications on top. The stage was dark at the beginning of the song with a single spotlight concentrating on Sašenko, and the LED screens displayed white stars against a black backdrop later on in the performance with more light spots. The performance also featured Sašenko using sign language in the second verse of the song. Evelina Sašenko was joined by a pianist, the co-composer of "C'est ma vie" Paulius Zdanavičius, who was dressed in white.

At the end of the show, Lithuania was announced as having finished in the top 10 and subsequently qualifying for the grand final. It was later revealed that Lithuania placed fifth in the semi-final, receiving a total of 81 points.

Final 
Shortly after the first semi-final, a winners' press conference was held for the ten qualifying countries. As part of this press conference, the qualifying artists took part in a draw to determine the running order for the final. This draw was done in the order the countries were announced during the semi-final. Lithuania was drawn to perform in position 25, following the entry from Serbia.

Evelina Sašenko once again took part in dress rehearsals on 13 and 14 May before the final, including the jury final where the professional juries cast their final votes before the live show. The band performed a repeat of their semi-final performance during the final on 14 May. Lithuania placed nineteenth in the final, scoring 63 points.

Voting 
Voting during the three shows consisted of 50 percent public televoting and 50 percent from a jury deliberation. The jury consisted of five music industry professionals who were citizens of the country they represent. This jury was asked to judge each contestant based on: vocal capacity; the stage performance; the song's composition and originality; and the overall impression by the act. In addition, no member of a national jury could be related in any way to any of the competing acts in such a way that they cannot vote impartially and independently.

Following the release of the full split voting by the EBU after the conclusion of the competition, it was revealed that Lithuania had placed twentieth with both the public televote and the jury vote in the final. In the public vote, Lithuania scored 55 points, while with the jury vote, Lithuania scored 66 points. In the first semi-final, Lithuania placed eleventh with the public televote with 52 points and first with the jury vote, scoring 113 points.

Below is a breakdown of points awarded to Lithuania and awarded by Lithuania in the first semi-final and grand final of the contest. The nation awarded its 12 points to Georgia in the semi-final and the final of the contest.

Points awarded to Lithuania

Points awarded by Lithuania

References

External links 
  Eurovizija 2011 official website

2011
Countries in the Eurovision Song Contest 2011
Eurovision